Nematolepis phebalioides, is a small, spreading shrub with ascending branches covered in scales, smooth, glossy leaves and pendulous, red tubular flowers with yellow or green tips, flowering from March to December.  It is endemic to Western Australia.

Description
Flowering occurs sporadically throughout the year, mostly in winter.

Taxonomy
This species was first formally described by Nicolai Turczaninow in 1852 and the description was published in Bulletin de la Société Impériale des Naturalistes de Moscou.

Distribution and habitat
Nematolepis phebalioides is endemic to the south coast of Western Australia from Dumbleyung  and east to Israelite Bay. It grows in loam, clay, coastal limestone, sand dunes and on lateritic hills and in mallee thickets.

References

Flora of Western Australia
phebalioides